Time in Mauritania is given by a single time zone, denoted as Greenwich Mean Time (GMT; UTC±00:00). Mauritania shares this time zone with several other countries, including fourteen in western Africa. Mauritania does not observe daylight saving time (DST).

IANA time zone database 
In the IANA time zone database, Mauritania is given one zone in the file zone.tab – Africa/Nouakchott, which is an alias to Africa/Abidjan. "MR" refers to the country's ISO 3166-1 alpha-2 country code. Data for Mauritania directly from zone.tab of the IANA time zone database; columns marked with * are the columns from zone.tab itself:

See also 
Time in Africa
List of time zones by country

References

External links 
Current time in Mauritania at Time.is
Time in Mauritania at TimeAndDate.com

Time in Mauritania